MCX (micro coaxial connector) are coaxial RF connectors developed in the 1980s. They have the same inner contact and insulator dimensions as the SMB connector but are 30% smaller.  MCX is standardized in European CECC 22220.

Connector design
MCX connectors use a snap-on interface and usually have a 50 Ω impedance (some are 75 Ω) . They offer broadband capability from DC to 6 GHz. The contact surfaces are gold-plated.

The outer diameter of the plug is approx 3.6 mm or 0.140 inch.

Use
MCX and the smaller MMCX connector are frequently used to connect external antennas 
to GPS receivers. They are also common on USB DVB-T tuners for computers and laptops, to connect an external antenna to the tuner.

The MCX connector is also being used on at least some of the new generation of mostly inexpensive software-defined oscilloscopes and/or signal generators such as the DS212. This is a low frequency application, at most a few MHz bandwidth, so the electrical performance characteristics are relatively unimportant, however the small size would appear to be an important feature.

See also
 MMCX connector (micro-miniature coaxial connector)
 TNC connector
 SMA connector
 F connector

References

RF connectors